Schatzl or Schätzl is a German surname. Notable people with the surname include:

Nadine Schatzl (born 1993), Hungarian handball player
Sara Schätzl (born 1987), German columnist, author, actress, and businesswoman

See also
Schatzi

German-language surnames